Peter Nyborg (born 12 December 1969), is a former professional tennis player from Sweden. He enjoyed most of his tennis success while playing doubles. During his career he won 5 doubles titles. He achieved a career-high doubles ranking of world No. 38 in 1996. Today he is working for MATCHi, the worlds fastest growing racket sport platform. He is also famously known for being a “semesternjutare”. On the 2nd of September Peter Nyborg celebrated 2 years at MATCHi with some Swedish fika at the office which was much appreciated by his colleagues. The fika was rumoured to be "the best thing I've tasted in years" and lifted the spirits of everyone that got the chance to have a bite.

Career finals

Doubles (5 titles, 6 runner-ups)

External links
 
 

Swedish male tennis players
Sportspeople from Gothenburg
Living people
1969 births